The Granite Hydroelectric Power Station was built in 1896–1897 at the mouth of Big Cottonwood Canyon, about  southeast of Salt Lake City, Utah, United States(in what is now eastern Cottonwood Heights. The plant comprises the powerhouse, transformer house, a wooden conduit, penstocks, and a small dam. Like the Stairs Station upstream, it represents an intact high-head generating plant from the late 19th century.

Description
The powerhouse is a rectangular brick building on a concrete foundation, with extensive corbeling. The interior is a single room with two Pelton wheels flanking a generator, which replaced two older turbine-generator units. A work area in the station was powered by a  Pelton wheel driving a belt, an unusual feature. The ceiling is a peaked assembly of steel beams with an arched brick infill. Water is supplied through a steel conduit and penstock system with a  head from the Stairs Station upstream. The dam, built in 1945, is part of neither historic district.

The transformer house is a plainer version of the power house. The operator's residence is nearby, built using the same sand-colored brick with extensive corbeling and a hipped roof. Two other residences of wood frame construction stand nearby, added in the 1920s. The present operator's residence is outside the historic district.

History
The Granite Power Station was built beginning in 1896 by the Utah Power Company, owned by the Salt Lake City Railroad Company to provide power to the company's streetcar system. The station did not live up to expectations and was frequently out of service. After several changes of ownership, the plant passed into the hands of Utah Power and Light in 1912. PacifiCorp later took ownership in 1989 operating the site under its own name as well as the name Rocky Mountain Power.

The Granite Power Station was placed on the National Register of Historic Places on April 20, 1989.

See also

 National Register of Historic Places listings in Salt Lake County, Utah
 Stairs Station Hydroelectric Power Plant Historic District

References

External links

 

Industrial buildings and structures on the National Register of Historic Places in Utah
Victorian architecture in Utah
Renaissance Revival architecture in Utah
Buildings and structures completed in 1896
Buildings and structures in Cottonwood Heights, Utah
Historic American Engineering Record in Utah
Hydroelectric power plants in Utah
Historic districts on the National Register of Historic Places in Utah
National Register of Historic Places in Salt Lake County, Utah
Energy infrastructure on the National Register of Historic Places